Ghebreselassie Yoseph (Tigrinya: ግሄብረሰላስሴ ዮሴፍ) was Minister of Finance of Eritrea from February 1997 to 2001.

References

Living people
Year of birth missing (living people)
People's Front for Democracy and Justice politicians
Finance ministers of Eritrea
Government ministers of Eritrea